Isabel Cueto (born 3 December 1968) is a retired professional tennis player from Germany. Her career-high ranking was No. 20, which she achieved in 1989.

Early life
Isabel Cueto was born in Kehl to her father, Toni, an electrical engineer who had immigrated from Bolivia, and her mother, Jutta, a German. She grew up in Aspach and attended school in Backnang.

Career
In 1984, Cueto became the youngest German national champion, winning the final against Elke Renz. She also won the German championship in 1986 and 1987.

Cueto won a total of six titles on the main WTA Tour over the course of her career; five in singles, one in doubles. She also won four titles on the ITF Women's Circuit. She progressed to the third round at the French Open (1985, 1990) and the US Open (1987, 1988), her best finishes at Grand Slam events.

She represented the Germany Fed Cup team four times from 1988–1990, playing all four matches in doubles ties. Her win–loss record was 3–1.

After tennis
Cueto trained for a teaching career at the Ludwigsburg University of Education and teaches at the Matern-Feuerbacher Realschule in Großbottwar. She married Oliver Baumann, and they have two children, Ines and Eric.

WTA finals

Singles (5–3)

Doubles (1–0)

ITF Finals

Singles (4–2)

References

External links
 
 
 

1968 births
German female tennis players
German people of Bolivian descent
Hopman Cup competitors
Living people
People from Kehl
Sportspeople from Freiburg (region)
West German female tennis players
Tennis people from Baden-Württemberg